Acoustic was released in 2007, recorded live during 1995 and is the second live album to be released by the group Deine Lakaien.

This live album was recorded during the sold-out 1995 Acoustic Tour. The songs were performed unplugged, with Alexander Veljanov's vocals backed by Ernst Horn on a prepared piano.

Track listing
"Love me to the end" – 5:02
"Lonely" – 4:23 
"Down down down" – 3:51
"Mindmachine" – 4:44
"Nobody's wounded" – 4:51
"Mirror men" – 5:52
"Walk to the moon" – 3:20
"Wasted years" – 3:55
"2nd sun" – 4:17
"Don't wake me up" – 4:53
"Follow me" – 4:30
"Madiel" – 3:52
"Dark Star" – 3:40
"Traitors" – 3:48
"Resurrection Machine" – 4:18

See also
Acoustic music

Deine Lakaien albums
1995 live albums